Count of Latores  is a hereditary  title of Spanish nobility. It was created on 30 April 1992 by King Juan Carlos I of Spain in favor of Sabino Fernández Campo, Head of the Royal Household of Spain under King Juan Carlos I, from 1990 to 1993. The title is accompanied by the dignity of Grandee of Spain.

List of Holders
 Sabino Fernández Campo, 1st Count of Latores (1992–2009)
 María Elena Fernández Fernández-Vega, 2nd Countess of Latores (2010- )

References

Lists of Spanish nobility
Noble titles created in 1992